The 1951–52 NBA season was the Pistons' fourth season in the NBA and 11th season as a franchise.

The Pistons struggled on the year, finishing with a 29-37 (.439) record, 4th place in the West Division.  The team advanced to the playoffs, losing 2-0 in the opening round to the Rochester Royals.  The team was led by guard Frank Brian (15.9 ppg, 3.5 apg, NBA All-Star) and a double-double from center/forward Larry Foust (15.9 ppg, 13.3 rpg), NBA All-Star).

During the NBA season, the Washington Capitols folded and their players were dispersed through a draft.  The Pistons chose Bill Sharman, a future Hall of Fame inductee, but he refused to report to Fort Wayne and the Pistons traded him to the Boston Celtics.

Draft picks

Regular season

Season standings

x – clinched playoff spot

Record vs. opponents

Game log

Playoffs

|- align="center" bgcolor="#ffcccc"
| 1
| March 18
| @ Rochester
| L 78–95
| Larry Foust (17)
| Edgerton Park Arena
| 0–1
|- align="center" bgcolor="#ffcccc"
| 2
| March 20
| Rochester
| L 86–92
| Jack Kerris (17)
| North Side High School Gym
| 0–2
|-

Awards and records
Larry Foust, All-NBA Second Team

References

See also
1951–52 NBA season

Detroit Pistons seasons
Fort